Waltham Windmill is a six-sailed windmill located in the village of Waltham, five miles from Grimsby in North East Lincolnshire, England. It is renowned in the area for having all six sails still in full working capacity, being one of the very few windmills like this in the United Kingdom.

Construction
The first mill on this site was built in 1666 and was a trestle post mill. The location was well set on the Brigsley Road with good transport into Grimsby and out towards the farms of the Lincolnshire Wolds. This mill was blown down in 1744, but soon replaced with another post mill to continue the job of the old. Unfortunately for the residents of the area, this one suffered a similar fate, being blown down in 1873.

Construction of the one that stands today began in 1878 and was completed by the accomplished water-colour painter John Saunderson from Louth, Lincolnshire in 1880. (A painting of Louth Parish Church (south elevation, and titled "Louth Cathedral, south elevation") remains to this day in his descendants family.) The new windmill was constructed of local brick and coated with a layer of tar as a seal against the elements. The six-storied mill had a greater capacity than the previous post mills and featured 6 double-sided sails, driving four pairs of grinding stones for the production of flour (two so-called greystones (peak stones, cut from rock of the Peak District) and two French quartzite stones).

Later years

In the 1920s, the sails were reconstructed to single-sided sails to increase its efficiency in light winds.
It is said that during World War II whilst RAF Grimsby was being constructed the Air Ministry saw the Windmill as a possible waypoint for German Bombers. They went to see the Farmer who owned the mill and told him they would destroy it along with the Grimsby Dock Tower and Binbrook Windmill. The farmer then went to get his shotgun and chased them off his land and they only returned to construct the W.A.A.F. canteen. Grimsby Dock Tower survived due to it holding a Royal Navy wireless transmitter, however Binbrook Windmill was demolished.
By 1962, Waltham Windmill was one of the last windmills in England to be fully operational by wind, but from this point until 1967, it was powered by electricity.

The Windmill Today
Within the grounds of the windmill, there are a miniature railway, a museum dedicated to Rural Life, Grimsby Telephone museum, an old sweet shop selling favourites from the 1920s to the 1970s, an Indian restaurant, and a café housed in the body of an old Great Northern Railway 6-wheel carriage. The windmill itself is still standing, and is funded by the Waltham Windmill Preservation Society and the Waltham Windmill Trust and various events are held throughout the year, ranging from Car-Boot Sales on Sunday mornings, mainly during the summer, to Classic Car Rallies, Airshows, and an annual firework display held on the first Saturday every November.

Trivia

In 2001 the windmill cap and sails were removed so that they could be restored and repainted.
The Windmill is also used as the symbol for Waltham's Infant and Junior Schools logos.
In 2013 the windmill was restored at a cost of £30,000.

References

Source: Great Grimsby Library Records Office

External links

Waltham Windmill Trust
Waltham Windmill Preservation Society
Railway, Museum, Railway Carriage
McMillers Sweet Emporium
Brushstrokes Ceramics
RAF Grimsby Exhibition

Museums in Lincolnshire
Windmills in Lincolnshire
Tower mills in the United Kingdom
Grinding mills in the United Kingdom
Windmills
Mill museums in England
Windmills completed in 1880
1666 establishments in England